Iowa-Oto may be,

Iowa-Oto language
Oto, Iowa